The 1991 Cork Intermediate Hurling Championship was the 82nd staging of the Cork Intermediate Hurling Championship since its establishment by the Cork County Board in 1909. The draw for the opening round fixtures took place on 16 December 1990. The championship ran from 18 May to 24 August 1991.

The final was played on 24 August 1991 at Páirc Uí Chaoimh in Cork between Tracton and Inniscarra, in what was their first meeting in the final. Tracton won the match by 4-14 to 5-09 to claim their first ever championship title.

Inniscarra's Ger Manley was the championship's top scorer with 4-30.

Team changes

To Championship

Promoted from the Cork Junior Hurling Championship
 Midleton

From Championship

Regraded to the West Cork Junior A Hurling Championship
 Ballinascarthy

Results

First round

Second round

Quarter-finals

Semi-finals

Final

Championship statistics

Top scorers

Top scorers overall

Top scorers in a single game

References

Cork Intermediate Hurling Championship
Cork Intermediate Hurling Championship